The Xiushan Formation is a palaeontological formation located in China. It dates to the Lower Silurian period.

See also 
 List of fossil sites

References
  (1993); Wildlife of Gondwana. Reed. 

Geologic formations of China
Silurian System of Asia
Silurian China
Silurian northern paleotropical deposits
Silurian paleontological sites
Paleontology in China